The William S. and Mary Beckett House is a historic house located in Boonville, Cooper County, Missouri. It was built in 1903, and is a -story, Queen Anne style brick dwelling. It has a complex, steep hipped and lower cross-gable roofs and projecting bays. It features decorative, terra cotta panels with a six-pointed star-like design.

It was listed on the National Register of Historic Places on March 16, 1990.

References

Houses on the National Register of Historic Places in Missouri
Queen Anne architecture in Missouri
Houses completed in 1903
Houses in Cooper County, Missouri
National Register of Historic Places in Cooper County, Missouri
1903 establishments in Missouri
Boonville, Missouri